Sergei Nikolayevich Pichugin (born 9 March 1976) is a former Russian football player.

References

1976 births
Living people
Russian footballers
FC Chernomorets Novorossiysk players
Russian Premier League players
FC KAMAZ Naberezhnye Chelny players
FC Kristall Smolensk players
Association football forwards
FC Nosta Novotroitsk players